"Little Bit of Heaven" is a song by British singer-songwriter and actress Lisa Stansfield from her third album, So Natural (1993). It was released as the second proper single in the United Kingdom on 29 November 1993 and in other European countries in March 1994. The song was written by Stansfield and her husband, Ian Devaney, and produced by Devaney.

An accompanying music video, directed by Marcus Raboy, was also released. The CD single included "Gonna Try It Anyway," which was available on the Japanese edition of So Natural only, and remixes of "Little Bit of Heaven" created by David Morales, Pete Heller, Terry Farley, Roach Motel, Paul Waller and Seamus Haji. The song reached number thirty-two in the United Kingdom.

In 1994, Arista Records released in Japan a special CD maxi single "Marvellous & Mine Natural Selection" which included remixes form the So Natural era. In 2003, "Little Bit of Heaven" was included on Biography: The Greatest Hits. In 2014, the remixes of "Little Bit of Heaven" were included on the deluxe 2CD + DVD re-release of So Natural (also on The Collection 1989–2003).

Chart performance
"Little Bit of Heaven" was not as successful commercially as the earlier singles, but it still made some impact on the charts in Europe. In the UK, the song peaked at number 32 in its first week on the UK Singles Chart on 5 December 1993. It then dropped to number 43 and then to 54, where it stayed for two weeks before leaving the UK Top 75. On the UK Dance Singles Chart, it was far more successful, peaking at number 12. It was also a top 30 hit in Iceland (26) and a top 60 hit in Germany (54). On the Eurochart Hot 100, "Little Bit of Heaven" reached number 92 in December 1993. Outside Europe, it charted in Australia, peaking at number 153.

Critical reception
In an 2018 retrospective review, Quentin Harrison from Albumism described "Little Bit of Heaven" as "breezy", with "its flavor deepened with some chirpy disco widgetry." AllMusic editor William Cooper deemed it a "bland, dated-sounding synth pop throwback". In his weekly UK chart commentary, James Masterton noted that here, Stansfield "eases back onto the dancefloor for her third hit of the year". Pan-European magazine Music & Media wrote, "What would the entire heaven be like, is the question that arises on hearing this danceable soul song. May it turn the world into paradise for the four minutes that it takes." Alan Jones from Music Week gave it three out of five, commenting, "In isolation, this classily delivered song is pleasant enough, but it would be nice to hear Stansfield ringing the changes. A selection of dance mixes vary the tempo a bit, but not much." James Hamilton from the RM Dance Update called it a "pleasantly melodic light-weight mellow lurching loper". In an 2015 retrospective review, Pop Rescue remarked that "there's some nice vocal harmonies in the chorus, with some funky brass sections and disco 'pops'."

Music video
A music video was produced to promote the single, directed by American film and music video director Marcus Raboy. It was filmed in Rome, Italy and depicts Stansfield alone in an old apartment, performing the song. In between, there are clips of a young boy running around in the streets of the district and of female dancers performing. In the beginning, Stansfield sits on a bed while she sings. Other times she is seen by a large round table or looking at herself in a dusty mirror. By a window, the curtains slowly blows in the wind. The boy passes an elderly man who puts up advertisements on the walls and stops by a newspaper kiosk where he runs off with a magazine. He tears out a page and then appears at the door of Stansfield's apartment, peeking at the singer while she sings and dances. Towards the end, there are some scenes with her performing outdoors, obviously standing on top of the building, overlooking the other old buildings.

Track listings
 European 7-inch single and Japanese CD single
"Little Bit of Heaven" (radio mix) – 4:16
"Gonna Try It Anyway" – 3:53

 European 12-inch single
"Little Bit of Heaven" (Bad Yard Club 12-inch mix) – 7:27
"Little Bit of Heaven" (Bad Yard dub) – 5:44
"Little Bit of Heaven" (radio mix) – 4:16
"Little Bit of Heaven" (Junior vocal mix) – 6:39
"Little Bit of Heaven" (Roach Motel dub) – 9:06
"Little Bit of Heaven" (Seventh Heaven vocal mix) – 6:21

 European CD single
"Little Bit of Heaven" (radio mix) – 4:16
"Gonna Try It Anyway" – 3:53
"Little Bit of Heaven" (Bad Yard Club 12-inch mix) – 7:27
"Little Bit of Heaven" (Junior vocal mix) – 6:39

Charts

References

Lisa Stansfield songs
1993 singles
1993 songs
Arista Records singles
British synth-pop songs
Music videos directed by Marcus Raboy
Songs written by Ian Devaney
Songs written by Lisa Stansfield